Barazin in Iran may refer to:
 Barazin, Heris
 Barazin, Khoda Afarin
 Barazin, Varzaqan